This is the discography of American rapper G. Dep.

Albums

Studio albums

Collaborative albums

Singles

Other charted songs

Guest appearances

Music videos

Notes 

A  "And We" did not enter the Hot R&B/Hip-Hop Songs chart, but peaked at number 2 on the Bubbling Under R&B/Hip-Hop Singles chart, which acts as an extension to the Hot R&B/Hip-Hop Songs chart.
B  "The Godfather" did not enter the Hot R&B/Hip-Hop Songs chart, but peaked at number 13 on the Bubbling Under R&B/Hip-Hop Singles chart, which acts as an extension to the Hot R&B/Hip-Hop Songs chart.

References

External links
 G. Dep at AllMusic
 
 

Discographies of American artists
Hip hop discographies